Deke Dickerson (born 3 June 1968) is an American singer, songwriter, guitarist and film composer.

Dickerson was born in St. Louis, Missouri. After playing in several local rockabilly bands, Deke formed The Untamed Youth at age 17 in his hometown of Columbia, Missouri. In 1991 he moved to Los Angeles and joined Dave Stuckey to form the Dave & Deke Combo, a partnership that yielded two albums and a 2005 reunion at major rockabilly festivals. Joining the Ecco-Fonics in 1998, Deke toured, signed to HighTone Records and released three albums for the label. His style incorporates country, alternative country, rockabilly, hillbilly, blues, western swing and rock 'n' roll.

Dickerson writes a regular column in Guitar Player magazine and feature articles in Vintage Guitar magazine and The Fretboard Journal. He also organizes an annual "Guitar Geek Festival" held in Anaheim, California, every January, during the NAMM Show. He owns a Ray Butts EchoSonic, serial number 24, a rare amplifier with built-in tape echo that used to belong to Scotty Moore.

In 2018, Dickerson wrote the soundtrack for the film Action Point.

References

External links
 
 Deke Dickerson Interview NAMM Oral History Library (2018)

1968 births
Living people
Guitarists from Columbia, Missouri
Composers from Columbia, Missouri
American male guitarists
20th-century American guitarists
20th-century American male musicians